John Tabb DuVal (born 1940) is an American academic and an award-winning translator of Old French, Modern French, Italian, Romanesco, and Italian. He has been a professor of English and Creative Writing and Translation at the University of Arkansas since 1982.

Biography
Born in Germantown, Pennsylvania, in 1940, to Thaddeus Ernest DuVal and Helene Dupont Cau, John DuVal grew up in Jenkintown, a suburb of Philadelphia. He holds an A.B. in English from Franklin and Marshall College in Lancaster, Pennsylvania, a Master of Arts in English from the University of Pennsylvania, and a Master's in French, a Master of Fine Arts in Translation, and a PhD in Comparative Literature from the University of Arkansas. Until 2008 DuVal directed the University's acclaimed Program in Literary Translation. Known for his numerous entertaining keynote addresses on translation, he is also the author of 13 books of translation, and his original poems and articles on translation have been published and republished widely.  DuVal's teaching areas of expertise include Translation Theory and Practice; Creative Writing; Comparative Literature; World Sonnet; Dante; Medieval Literature; and Epic Poetry. DuVal was named Fulbright College Visiting Fellow to Wolfson College of Cambridge University (UK) for the year 2010–2011 to complete his translation of the French epic, The Song of Roland.

Selected honors and awards

2008: Special Panel honoring the work of Juliane Hause, Marilyn Gaddis-Rose, and John DuVal, Keynote Speakers at the World Conference on Translation and Globalism, Abu Dhabi, November 21.
2006: Raissiz/de Palchi Award for best book of translations from Italy (Tales of Trilussa), awarded by the Academy of American Poets.
2005: Grant from the District of Columbia Commission on Arts and Humanities for Banishèd productions staged readings of three translations from From Adam to Adam ("The Play of Adam", "Greenwood Follies" and "The Miracle of Theophile"), Arena Stage, Washington, D.C., October 17.
2005: Provost’s Visiting Scholar, University of Montana, September 19–23.
2005: "Marilyn Gaddis Rose Keynote Speaker" for the Literary Division of the American Translators Association, Seattle, November.
1999: Major Award from the National Endowment of the Arts for translation of Adam le Bossu's "Greenwood Follies" ("Jeu de la feuillée").
1996-1998: Executive Council, American Literary Translators Association.
1992: Harold Morton Landon Translation Award for The Discovery of America, awarded by the Academy of American Poets.
1992: University of Arkansas Board of Regents Citation for Outstanding Service.
1982: Cuckolds, Clerics, and Countrymen, a Choice magazine Outstanding Academic Book of the Year.

Selected publications

The Song of Roland, tr. from Old French. Cambridge, MA: Hackett Publishers, 2012.
Interpreting a Continent: Voices from Colonial America (with Kathleen DuVal), Rowman and Littlefield Publishers, March 2009.
From Adam to Adam: Seven Old French Plays (with Raymond Eichmann), Asheville, NC: Pegasus Paperbooks, 2005.
Oblivion and Stone: A Selection of Contemporary Bolivian Poetry and Fiction (ed. Sandra Reyes, co-translated with Reyes, Gastón Fernández-Torriente, and Kay Pritchett). Fayetteville: University of Arkansas Press, 1998.
Fabliaux, Fair and Foul (with Raymond Eichmann), Binghamton, NY.: Pegasus Paperbooks of The Medieval and Early Renaissance Texts Society, 1992; reprinted by Pegasus, Asheville, N.C., 1999 and 2008.
The Discovery of America by Cesare Pascarella, tr. from Romanesco.  Fayetteville: University of Arkansas Press, 1991; reprinted, 2006.
Tales of Trilussa by Carlo Alberto Salustri, tr. from Romanesco.  Fayetteville: University of Arkansas Press, 1990; reprinted, 2006.
Long Blues in A Minor by Gerard Herzhaft, tr. from French.  Fayetteville: University of Arkansas Press, 1988; reprinted, 2006.
The Fabliaux:  The B.N. 837 Manuscript (with R. Eichmann). New York: Garland Library of Medieval Literature, Vol. II, 1986.
The Fabliaux:  The B.N. 837 Manuscript (with R. Eichmann). New York: Garland Library of Medieval Literature, Vol. I, 1984.
Cuckolds, Clerics, and Countrymen: Medieval French Fabliaux (with Raymond Eichmann).  Fayetteville: University of Arkansas Press, 1982.

References

Fellows of Wolfson College, Cambridge
Living people
1940 births
University of Arkansas faculty
American translators
Franklin & Marshall College alumni
University of Pennsylvania alumni
University of Arkansas alumni